The 2018 season was the 90th season of competitive association football in Japan.

Promotion and relegation 
Teams relegated from J1 League
 Ventforet Kofu
 Albirex Niigata
 Omiya Ardija

Teams promoted to J1 League
 Shonan Bellmare
 V-Varen Nagasaki
 Nagoya Grampus

Teams relegated from J2 League
 Thespakusatsu Gunma

Teams promoted to J2 League
 Tochigi SC

Teams relegated from J3 League
 No relegation to the Japan Football League

Teams promoted to J3 League
 No promotion from the Japan Football League

Teams promoted to Japan Football League
Cobaltore Onagawa
Tegevajaro Miyazaki

Men's Football

J1 League

J2 League

J3 League

Japan Football League

Cup competitions

Emperor's Cup 

Final

J.League Cup 

Final

Super Cup

AFC Champions League

Play-off round

Group stage

Group E

Group F

Group G

Group H

Knockout stage

Round of 16

Quarter-finals

Semi-finals

Final 

Kashima Antlers won 2–0 on aggregate.

Women's football

L.League

Nadeshiko League Div.1

Nadeshiko League Div.2

Cup competitions

Empress's Cup 

Final

Nadeshiko League Cup 

Final

National team (Men)

Results

Friendlies 

Kirin Challenge Cup

2018 FIFA World Cup

Group H 

Matches

Knockout stage

Players statistics

National team (Women)

Results

Players statistics

References

External links

 
Seasons in Japanese football